The Divine Stevie Nicks is a 2001 budget compilation album featuring songs from the solo career of American singer/songwriter and Fleetwood Mac vocalist Stevie Nicks.  The album features many of her songs from her solo albums The Wild Heart and The Other Side of the Mirror.

The album was released in Europe only on EMI Records, but it failed to chart.

Track listing

References

Stevie Nicks albums
2001 greatest hits albums
EMI Records compilation albums